The M-series of desktops are part of Lenovo's ThinkCentre product line. Formerly an IBM brand, Lenovo acquired the ThinkCentre desktop brand following its purchase of IBM's Personal Computing Division (PCD) in 2005. Following its acquisition of IBM's PCD, Lenovo has released M-series desktops in multiple form factors, ranging from traditional tower, to small form factor, and all-in-ones (AIOs).

2003
In 2003, IBM redesigned and re-launched their ThinkCentre product line. The first desktop released was an M-series desktop – the M50.

M50
The first desktop in IBM's redesigned ThinkCentre line was the M50, announced in 2003. The desktop offered the following specifications:
Processor: Intel Pentium 4 3.0 GHz
RAM: 256 MB PC2700 DDR
Storage: 40 GB 7200 RPM
Graphics: Intel Extreme 2 (integrated, 64MB of shared video RAM)
Optical drive: 48x CD-ROM
Audio: SoundMAX Cadenza audio without speakers
Operating system: Microsoft Windows XP Professional
USB ports: eight USB 2.0 Ports

While the desktop was made available as a consumer PC, it was more suited to a corporate environment, with the limited storage and graphics capabilities.

2005
The ThinkCentre desktop released by Lenovo in 2005, following its acquisition of IBM's PCD was the M52.

M52
The ThinkCentre M52 desktop was announced in May 2005 following Lenovo's acquisition of IBM's Personal Computing Division. PC World called the M52 desktop, "A corporate machine for the security conscious business user looking for stability and reliability". The M52 desktop was equipped with a 3 GHz Pentium 4 processors, an 80 GB hard disk drive, up to 4 GB of RAM, eight USB 2.0 ports, two serial ports, a Gigabit Ethernet connection, VGA output, and a chassis that did not require tools to open − a toolless chassis.

2006
The ThinkCentre M55, M55p, and M55e were announced by Lenovo in September 2006.

M55
The ThinkCentre M55 received a positive review from PC World, with the reviewer stating that "The Lenovo ThinkCentre M55 9BM is a compact and quiet business PC that keeps maintenance simple and makes upgrades easy. Its design and functions are well-suited to an office environment and we think it's a good choice for any business searching for a uniformed PC roll-out."

The desktop offered the following specifications:
Processor: Intel Core 2 Duo E6300 1.86 GHz
RAM: 1 GB of DDR2
Storage: 80 GB

Despite the fact that the desktop was capable of handling Windows Vista Business, it was preloaded with Windows XP. While the chassis was similar to previous ThinkCentre desktops, it was made smaller to fit better in office spaces.

M55p
The ThinkCentre M55p desktop offered the following specifications:
Processor: Intel Core 2 Duo E6600
RAM: 1 GB PC2-5300 DDR2
Storage: 160 GB 7200 rpm SATA
Graphics: Intel GMA 3000 Integrated Graphics (256 MB shared video RAM)
Audio: Intel HD Audio
Optical drive: 16x Dual Layer DVD reader/writer
USB ports: ten USB 2.0 ports
Operating System: Windows XP Professional

It was described by About.com as being "a very solid system for business users" and a "general purpose PC" for consumers. However, both multimedia performance and storage space were criticized.

M55e
The ThinkCentre M55e desktop was equipped with:
Processor: Intel Core 2 Duo E6300 1.86 GHz
RAM: 2 GB
Graphics: Intel GMA 3000 (integrated)
Storage: 250 GB hard disk drive
Operating System: Microsoft Windows Vista Business
Display: 22 inch LED widescreen

PCMag listed the pros as being the dual core processor, small form factor, enterprise-class hardware, ThinkVantage Technologies, and the three year on-site warranty. The price, the 90-day subscription to Symantec client security, and the lack of a DVD writer were listed as the cons of the desktop.

2007
The ThinkCentre M-series desktops released by Lenovo in 2007 were the M57 and M57p.

M57 and M57p
The ThinkCentre M57 and M57p desktops were announced in September 2007 by Lenovo. These were the first desktops from a manufacturer to receive a GREENGUARD certification. In addition, both desktops were EPEAT Gold and Energy Star 4.0 rated. They were also the first ThinkCentre desktops to incorporate recycled material from consumer plastics. The desktops were equipped with up to Intel Core 2 Duo processors, up to 2 GB DDR2 RAM, integrated graphics, and up to 160GB hard disk drive.

2008

M57 Eco and M57p Eco
The ThinkCentre M57 Eco and M57p Eco were announced by Lenovo in March 2008. These were eco-friendly versions of the M57 and M57p, which were released in 2007. The desktops were dubbed "eco" and had an ultra-small form factor with low power consumption. According to Desktop Review, the M57 used a fraction of the power needed by standard desktops, and a little more than that of an energy-saving notebook.

The M57 desktop offered the following specifications:
Processor: Intel Core 2 Duo E8400 3 GHz
Graphics: Intel X3100 (integrated)
RAM: up to 4 GB PC2-5300 DDR2 SDRAM
Storage: 160 GB 7200 rpm
Optical Drive: DVD Burner
Operating System: Windows Vista Business (32-bit)
Dimensions (inches): 11.8 x 9.4 x 3.2
Weight: 7 lbs

The M57p eco desktop had the same specifications as the M57 eco.

M58
The M58 and M58p were announced by Lenovo in October 2008.

The desktop offered the following specifications:
Processor: 2.33 GHz Intel Core 2 Quad
Storage: up to 500 GB hard disk drive
RAM: 2 GB RAM
Optical drive: DVD writer
Graphics: Intel GMA 4500
Audio: Intel HD audio
USB ports: eight USB ports
Operating System: Microsoft Windows Vista

M58p
The M58p was received by Desktop Review in a manner similar to the M58, with the reviewer stating, "The M58p is designed to meet all the stringent requirements commercial organizations have while still providing that Lenovo touch through OEM software, warranties and support."

The M58p desktop offered the following specifications:
Processor: 3.00 GHz Intel Core 2 Duo E8400
RAM: 4 GB 1066 MHz DDR3 SDRAM
Storage: 250 GB 7200 rpm SATA
Audio: integrated HD audio
Speakers: integrated speakers
Graphics: integrated graphics
Operating System: Windows Vista Home Premium
Customized with best options: (SFF)
Processor: Up to Intel Core 2 Quad Q9650 (3.0 GHz Clock)
RAM: Up to 8 or 16 GB 1066 MHz (updating bios) DDR3 Memory
Storage: Up to 2x1 TB 7200 rpm SATA
Graphics: Up to GT 1030 or GTX 750 Ti Graphics Card
Operating system: Genuine Windows 10 Pro (64-bit)

The pros of the system were listed by Desktop Review as the high-end configuration, the handle for easy movement, and the capacity for expansion. The cons were listed as being the price and the lack of DVI ports.

2009
The ThinkCentre M-series desktop released by Lenovo in 2009 was the M58e. The Small Form Factor version uses a BTX motherboard.

M58e
Lenovo announced the ThinkCentre M58e desktop in March 2009. The desktop offered the following specifications:
Processor: Intel Core 2 Duo E8400 3 GHz
RAM: up to 4 GB
Graphics: Intel GMA 4500 MHD (integrated)
Storage: 320 GB
Operating System: Microsoft Windows Vista Business

The desktop was EPEAT Gold rated and met Energy Star requirements. The M58e was also compatible with solar charger packs. PC Mag summarized its review of the desktop by saying "The Lenovo ThinkCentre M58e is a middle-of-the-road business PC, both in performance and features, though it does have the added benefits of Intel vPro and IT-friendly features. It's certainly worth a look if you need a PC environment that can grow with your business."

2010
The ThinkCentre M-series desktops released by Lenovo in 2010 were the M70e, M70z, M90, and M90z.

M70e
The M70e desktop was released by Lenovo in 2010 with the following specifications:
Processor: 3 GHz Intel Core 2 Duo E8400
Chipset: Intel G41
RAM: up to 4 GB 1066 MHz DDR3
Storage: 500 GB SATA
Graphics: Intel Graphics Media Accelerator X4500
Audio: Integrated HD audio
Operating System: Microsoft Windows 7 Professional (64 bit)

M90
The M90 desktop was released by Lenovo in 2010 with the following specifications:
Processor: 3.33 GHz Intel Core i5
RAM: up to 4 GB DDR3
Storage: up to 500 GB 7200RPM SATA
Optical drive: DVD reader/writer
Graphics: Intel GMA X4500
Form factor: Small form factor (SFF)
Dimensions (inches): 10.78 x 9.37 x 3.07

The M90 desktop received the "PCPro Recommended" award upon release, with an overall rating of five of six stars. The desktop was summarized as, "Expensive but, thanks to superb design and power, worth the cash for demanding business users".

M90z
Also released in 2010, the M90z was an all-in-one (AIO) desktop released by Lenovo. The AIO desktop offered the following specifications:
Processor: 3.2 GHz Intel Core i5-650
RAM: 4 GB
Storage: 500 GB
Graphics Card: Intel GMA HD
Optical Drive: Dual-Layer DVD reader/writer
Display: 23 inch HD widescreen (maximum resolutions of 1920x1080)
USB ports: 6 USB 2.0

PCMag listed the pros of the desktop as the compact design, HD display, support for two monitors, simple multi-touch interface, good component mix, stand options, and easy servicing. The cons were listed as the dull colors on videos because of the matte screen, the lack of an eSATA port, and the need for an adapter when using external DVI.

Computer shopper summarized the capabilities of the M90z with the statement, "In our test configuration, the business-oriented M90z is overkill for most office tasks. Configuration options, however, can bring down the price while still delivering a peppy big-screen office PC."

2011

M71e
The ThinkCentre M71e desktop was described by PCWorld as being "a basic PC designed for small and medium-sized businesses". The desktop was powered by an Intel Core i5-2500 processor and included 4 GB of DDR3 RAM, a 500 GB 7200 rpm hard disk drive, and AMD Radeon HD 5450 discrete graphics. The desktop was indicated to be good for everyday office tasks and offering suitable responsiveness. Despite the presence of three fans, the desktop was not "annoyingly loud".

The DVD bay was powered by a strong motor; the drive tray would eject and close almost as soon as the button was pressed with very little lag. The desktop was, overall, described as being a simple machine with a decent configuration, without "fancy features" such as a USB 3.0 port. Some legacy features, such as a PS/2 port were available on the desktop. Also, the assembly of the machine was described as "basic", with a messy internal appearance.

The one year on-site warranty was indicated as being one of the best features on the desktop. Other features on the desktop included four USB 2.0 ports, a Gigabit Ethernet port, DVI, Display Port, and analogue audio ports.

M71z
The M71z was described by IT Pro as being "a rare business all-in-one with a touchscreen." The default configuration offered a non-touch screen, with multi-touch as an optional upgrade. The touchscreen was described as being precise and responsive, with Lenovo applications using suitably large icons. However, the applications themselves were indicated to have not been optimized for touch control. Further, there were no touch-specific applications commonly found on consumer touchscreen devices.

The 1600 x 900 display was indicated to be "spacious enough" with acceptable color accuracy. However, the brightness level was indicated to be low, at 210.8 cd/m2.

The processing and graphical power was acceptable for everyday office tasks, with the all-in-one powered by an Intel Core i3-2100 processor and Intel HD 2000 integrated graphics. The use of graphics- and processing-intensive software was indicated to be a challenge, because of the lack of discrete graphics. Power consumption, heat levels, and noise levels were low. IT Pro commented that "the fans never became irritatingly loud. In fact, we had to press our ears up against the computer to even hear them."

The build of the all-in-one was described as being good, with strong, matte black plastic. Both keyboard and mouse were called reliable, with the keyboard described as responsive.

Detailed specifications of the M71z all-in-one are as follows:
Processor: Intel Pentium G260 (2.6 GHz)
Operating system: Microsoft Windows 7 Professional (64-bit)
Screen: 20-inches (non-touch by default; optional multi-touch upgrade)
RAM: Up to 8 GB
Storage:
1 TB 7200 rpm SATA II
160 GB SSD
WiFi: 802.11 a/b/g/n

M75e
The ThinkCentre M75e desktop was praised by SlashGear for its processing power and small form factor. In terms of design, the desktop was similar to other ThinkCentre products from Lenovo, with no unnecessary styling and designs.  Components could be accessed by removing two screws on the chassis.

The desktop contained an AMD Athlon II X4 640 processor, 4 GB of DDR3 RAM, a 500 GB hard disk drive, and ATI Radeon HD 3000 discrete graphics. The desktop was indicated by Lenovo to be "multi-monitor friendly", with the capacity to power two displays even with the basic configuration. An optional half-height graphics card also allowed two additional monitors to be powered, for a total of four independent displays.

The primary points of criticism were a direct result of the desktop's small form factor. Although the space for cooling was reduced, the M75e did not exceed stable temperatures. However, noise was a concern. The PC's fan would only run for a short duration at a high speed, making it louder than some desktops and workstations.

Detailed specifications of the ThinkCentre M75e desktop are as follows:
Processor: up to AMD Phenom II X4 B9x series
Operating system: Microsoft Windows 7 (Professional/Home Premium/Home Basic)
Chipset: AMD 750G + SB710
Storage: up to 500 GB 7200 rpm hard disk drive
RAM: up to 16 GB DDR3
Graphics:
ATI Radeon 3000 (integrated)
NVIDIA Quadro FX380
NVIDIA GeForce 310
NVIDIA GeForce 310

M77
Announced on October 28, 2011, the ThinkCentre M77 could be upgraded to include AMD's FX processors and up to 16GB of RAM. According to Tom Shell, the vice-president and general manager of Lenovo's Commercial Desktop Business Unit, this represented a level of processing power previously found only in premium desktops. The desktop was made available in both tower and small form factors.

According to Lenovo, the use of Enhanced Experience 3.0 allowed the desktop to boot in less than 30 seconds. The desktop optionally included AMD Radeon discrete graphics, with support for up to four independent displays. Additional features on the desktop included a hard disk drive of up to 1 TB, eight USB 2.0 ports, a 25-in-1 memory card reader, Trusted Platform Module, and hard disk encryption.

2012

M82
The M82 is available in Tower or SFF.

Specifications:
Standard: (Tower)
Processor: 2nd Generation Intel Core i3-2120 (3.3 GHz)
Operating System: Windows 7 Professional (64-bit)
RAM: 4 GB DDR3 Memory
Storage: 1x500 GB 7200 rpm SATA
Graphics: Integrated Graphics
Customized with best options: (Tower)
Processor: Up to 3rd generation Intel Core i7-3770 (3.4 GHz clock, 3.9 Turbo)
Operating system: Windows 7 Professional (64-bit)
RAM: Up to 8 GB DDR3 Memory
Storage: Up to 2x1 TB 7200 rpm SATA (Tower)
Graphics: Up to AMD Radeon HD 7450

2013

M92/M92p
The M92p is a desktop computer designed for business use. Like other computers of the M series, it exists in three form factors: tower, small form factor (SFF) and tiny. The M92p uses Intel Core i3, i5 or i7 processors and makes use of DDR3-1600 RAM. Graphics processing is done by an integrated Intel HD Graphics 2000 GPU. The M92p is available with both hard drives and solid-state storage. One difference with the M91p is that the M92p comes with four USB 3.0 ports on the rear of the computer, whilst the M91p only offers USB 2.0 ports.

In a review for ZDNet, Charles McLellan wrote, "Unless internal expansion is required, we can find little wrong with Lenovo's ThinkCentre M92p as a business-class small-form-factor PC (and there are bigger models in the range if expansion is required). Our review unit was only a moderate performer, but alternative configurations are available to give it more muscle if required."

Specifications (tower):
Processor:
Intel Core i7-3770
Intel Core i5-3470/3550/3570
Intel Core i3-2120/2130
Operating System:
Windows 7 Professional (64-bit)
Windows 8 Pro
RAM: Up to 32 GB DDR3
Storage: Up to 128 GB SSD or 2x1 TB 7200 rpm HDD
Graphics: AMD Radeon HD7350/HD7450

M93/M93p
The M93/M93p available in Tower Form Factor, Small Form Factor (SFF), and Tiny Form Factor.

Specifications (tower):
Processor:
Intel Core i7-4770
Intel Core i5-4430/4440S/4570/4670
Intel Core i3-4130/4330
Intel Pentium Dual Core G3220/G3420/G3430
Intel Celeron G1820/G1830
Operating System:
Windows 7 (Home Basic/Home Premium/Professional/Ultimate)
Windows 8.1/Windows 8.1 Pro
RAM: Up to 32 GB DDR3 (4 x 8 GB)
Storage: Up to 180 GB SSD or 2 TB 7200 rpm HDD
Graphics:
Intel Integrated
ATI Radeon HD8470
NVIDIA GeForce GT620/GT630

M83
The M83 is available in Mini Tower Form Factor, Small Form Factor, or Tiny Form Factor.

Specifications (mini tower):
Processor:
Intel Core i7-4770
Intel Core i5-4570/4670
Intel Core i3-4130/4330
Operating System:
Windows 7 Professional 64
Windows 8.1 64/Windows 8.1 Pro 64
RAM: Up to 32 GB DDR3
Storage: Up to 180 GB SSD or 2 TB 7200 rpm HDD
Graphics:
Intel Integrated
ATI Radeon HD8470/HD8570
NVIDIA GeForce GT620

2015

M900/M900x
The M900 series was announced in December, 2015. The M900 series is available in Tower Form Factor, Small Form Factor, or Tiny Form Factor. The M900x was only available in Tiny Form Factor.

Specifications (tower):
Processor:
Intel Core i7-6700
Intel Core i5-6400/6500
Intel Core i3-6100
Operating System:
Windows 7 Professional
Windows 10 (Home/Pro)
RAM: Up to 32 GB DDR4
Storage: Up to 512 GB SSD or 2 TB 7200 rpm HDD
Graphics:
Intel HD Graphics 530
NVIDIA Geforce GT 720 (1 GB/2 GB)
NVIDIA Quadro K420 2 GB

2016

M700

The M700 series was announced in January, 2016. The M700 series is available in Tower Form Factor, Small Form Factor, Tiny Form Factor, or Thin Client.

Specifications (tower):
Processor: Intel Core i5-6400
Operating System:
Windows 7 Professional
Windows 10 Pro
RAM: 8 GB DDR4
Storage:
Tower: 2x 3.5" Bay for HDD/SSD
SFF : 1x 3.5" HDD/2.5" SSD/2.5" HDD (Optional)

2017

M710 
The M710 series was announced in February, 2017. The M710 series consists of these models:

 M710t (tower form factor)
 M710s (small form factor)
 M710q (tiny form factor)

Specifications (tower):

 Processor: 6th or 7th Generation Intel Pentium, i3, i5 and i7
 Operating System: Windows 10 Pro (optional downgrade to Windows 7 Professional available)
 RAM: 4 GB or 8 GB DDR4
 Storage: 2 x 3.5" Bay for HDD + 1x NVMe M.2 drive slot

M715 
The M715 series was announced in June, 2017. The M715 series consists of these models:

 M715t (tower form factor)
 M715s (small form factor)
 M715q (tiny form factor) - 2nd generation was announced in July, 2018

Specifications (Tiny 2nd gen):

 Processor:
 AMD A6, A10 or A12 APUs
 AMD Ryzen 2nd generation APUs (Athlon 200GE, Ryzen 3 2200GE, Ryzen 5 2400GE)
 Operation System: Windows 10 Pro
 RAM: 4 GB or 8 GB DDR4
 Storage: 1x 2.5" HDD/SSD bay + 1x NVMe M.2 drive slot (drive in one of these is already installed)

Product Specifications Reference (historical entries) 
2021

Nano Desktops
 ThinkCentre M75n
 ThinkCentre M75n IoT
 ThinkCentre M75n Thin Client
 ThinkCentre M90n-1 Nano
 ThinkCentre M90n-1 Nano IoT
Tiny Desktops
 ThinkCentre M60e
 ThinkCentre M625 Tiny Thin Client
 ThinkCentre M630e Tiny
 ThinkCentre M70q
 ThinkCentre M70q Gen 2
 ThinkCentre M720 Tiny
 ThinkCentre M75q Gen 2
 ThinkCentre M75q Tiny
 ThinkCentre M80q
 ThinkCentre M90q
 ThinkCentre M90q Gen 2
 ThinkCentre M920 Tiny
 ThinkSmart Edition Tiny M80q
 ThinkSmart Edition Tiny M920q for Logitech
 ThinkSmart Edition Tiny M920q for Poly
 ThinkSmart Edition Tiny M920q for Zoom Rooms
SFF Desktops
 ThinkCentre M70s
 ThinkCentre M70c
 ThinkCentre M720 SFF
 ThinkCentre M75s Gen 2
 ThinkCentre M80s
 ThinkCentre M90s
 ThinkCentre M920 SFF
Tower Desktops
 ThinkCentre M70t
 ThinkCentre M720 Tower
 ThinkCentre M75t Gen 2
 ThinkCentre M80t
 ThinkCentre M90t
 ThinkCentre M920 Tower

2020

Nano Desktops
 ThinkCentre M75n
 ThinkCentre M75n IoT
 ThinkCentre M75n Thin Client
 ThinkCentre M90n-1 Nano
 ThinkCentre M90n-1 Nano IoT

Tiny Desktops
 ThinkCentre M70q
 ThinkCentre M80q
 ThinkCentre M625 Tiny
 ThinkCentre M625 Tiny Thin Client
 ThinkCentre M630e Tiny
 ThinkCentre M715 Tiny (2nd Gen)
 ThinkCentre M715 Tiny Thin Client (2nd Gen)
 ThinkCentre M720 Tiny
 ThinkCentre M75q Gen 2
 ThinkCentre M75q Tiny
 ThinkCentre M90q
 ThinkCentre M920 Tiny
 ThinkCentre M920x Tiny
 ThinkSmart Edition Tiny M920q for Logitech
 ThinkSmart Edition Tiny M920q for Poly
 ThinkSmart Edition Tiny M920q for Zoom Rooms

SFF Desktops
 ThinkCentre M70s
 ThinkCentre M70c
 ThinkCentre M720 SFF
 ThinkCentre M720e SFF
 ThinkCentre M725 SFF
 ThinkCentre M75s
 ThinkCentre M75s Gen 2
 ThinkCentre M80s
 ThinkCentre M90s
 ThinkCentre M920 SFF

Tower Desktops
 ThinkCentre M70t
 ThinkCentre M720 Tower
 ThinkCentre M75t Gen 2
 ThinkCentre M80t
 ThinkCentre M90t
 ThinkCentre M920 Tower

2019

Nano Desktops
 ThinkCentre M90n-1 Nano
 ThinkCentre M90n-1 Nano IoT

Tiny Desktops
 ThinkCentre M600 Tiny
 ThinkCentre M600 Tiny Thin Client
 ThinkCentre M625 Tiny
 ThinkCentre M625 Tiny Thin Client
 ThinkCentre M630e Tiny
 ThinkCentre M710 Tiny
 ThinkCentre M715 Tiny (2nd Gen)
 ThinkCentre M715 Tiny Thin Client
 ThinkCentre M715 Tiny Thin Client (2nd Gen)
 ThinkCentre M720 Tiny
 ThinkCentre M75q Tiny
 ThinkCentre M910 Tiny
 ThinkCentre M920 Tiny
 ThinkCentre M920x Tiny

SFF Desktops
 ThinkCentre M710 SFF
 ThinkCentre M710e SFF
 ThinkCentre M715 SFF
 ThinkCentre M720 SFF
 ThinkCentre M720e SFF
 ThinkCentre M725 SFF
 ThinkCentre M75s SFF
 ThinkCentre M910 SFF
 ThinkCentre M920 SFF

Tower Desktops
 ThinkCentre M710 Tower
 ThinkCentre M715 Tower
 ThinkCentre M720 Tower
 ThinkCentre M910 Tower
 ThinkCentre M920 Tower

2018

 ThinkCentre M600 Tiny
 ThinkCentre M600 Tiny Thin Client
 ThinkCentre M625 Tiny
 ThinkCentre M625 Tiny Thin Client
 ThinkCentre M710 SFF
 ThinkCentre M710 Tiny
 ThinkCentre M710 Tower
 ThinkCentre M710e SFF
 ThinkCentre M715 SFF
 ThinkCentre M715 Tiny
 ThinkCentre M715 Tiny (2nd Gen)
 ThinkCentre M715 Tiny Thin Client
 ThinkCentre M715 Tiny Thin Client (2nd Gen)
 ThinkCentre M715 Tower
 ThinkCentre M720 SFF
 ThinkCentre M720 Tiny
 ThinkCentre M720 Tower
 ThinkCentre M725 SFF
 ThinkCentre M910 SFF
 ThinkCentre M910 Tiny
 ThinkCentre M910 Tower
 ThinkCentre M910x Tiny
 ThinkCentre M920 SFF
 ThinkCentre M920 Tiny
 ThinkCentre M920 Tower
 ThinkCentre M920x Tiny

2017

 ThinkCentre M600 Tiny
 ThinkCentre M600 Tiny Thin Client
 ThinkCentre M710 SFF
 ThinkCentre M710 Tiny
 ThinkCentre M710 Tower
 ThinkCentre M715 SFF
 ThinkCentre M715 Tiny
 ThinkCentre M715 Tiny Thin Client
 ThinkCentre M715 Tower
 ThinkCentre M910 SFF
 ThinkCentre M910 Tiny
 ThinkCentre M910 Tower
 ThinkCentre M910x Tiny

2016

 ThinkCentre M600 Tiny
 ThinkCentre M700 SFF
 ThinkCentre M700 Tiny
 ThinkCentre M700 Tower
 ThinkCentre M715 Tiny
 ThinkCentre M79 SFF
 ThinkCentre M79 Tower
 ThinkCentre M800 SFF
 ThinkCentre M800 Tower
 ThinkCentre M900 SFF
 ThinkCentre M900 Tiny
 ThinkCentre M900 Tower
 ThinkCentre M900x Tiny

2015

 ThinkCentre M32 Thin Client
 ThinkCentre M53 Tiny
 ThinkCentre M600 Tiny
 ThinkCentre M73 SFF
 ThinkCentre M73 Tiny
 ThinkCentre M73 Tower
 ThinkCentre M73p Tower
 ThinkCentre M79 SFF
 ThinkCentre M79 Tower
 ThinkCentre M800 SFF Pro
 ThinkCentre M800 Tower
 ThinkCentre M83 SFF Pro
 ThinkCentre M83 Tiny
 ThinkCentre M83 Tower
 ThinkCentre M900 SFF Pro
 ThinkCentre M900 Tiny
 ThinkCentre M900 Tower
 ThinkCentre M93 M93p Tiny
 ThinkCentre M93 M93p Tower
 ThinkCentre M93p SFF Pro

2014

     ThinkCentre M32 Thin Client
     ThinkCentre M53 Tiny
     ThinkCentre M73 SFF
     ThinkCentre M73 Tiny
     ThinkCentre M73 Tower
     ThinkCentre M79 SFF
     ThinkCentre M79 Tower
     ThinkCentre M83 SFF Pro
     ThinkCentre M83 Tiny
     ThinkCentre M83 Tower
     ThinkCentre M93 M93p Tiny
     ThinkCentre M93 M93p Tower
     ThinkCentre M93p SFF Pro

References

External links 
 Lenovo M series Tiny desktops page 

Lenovo
X86 IBM personal computers